Ballina R.F.C. is a rugby union club in Ballina, County Mayo, Ireland. The club is affiliated to the Connacht Branch of the Irish Rugby Football Union and play in Division 2C of the All-Ireland League.

Honours
Connacht Senior League: 5.5
1928-29, 1929–30, 1950-51 (shared), 1952–53, 1991–92, 2021–22

References

External links
Ballina RFC website

Irish rugby union teams
Senior Irish rugby clubs (Connacht)